Archips eupatris is a species of moth of the family Tortricidae first described by Edward Meyrick in 1908. It is found in Sri Lanka.

Description
The wingspan of an adult male is 16–19 mm. The head and scape of antenna are deep reddish ferruginous. The thorax is bright ferruginous. Abdomen light glossy ochreous golden. Anal tuft touched with buff. Forewings broad and truncate. Costal fold oblong-oval and light fulvous in color. Forewings deep ferruginous. A dark, broad, blackish-purple edge runs from below costal fold base to the base of the dorsum and along the dorsum. An oblong horizontal pale ocherous spot is found inside the basal patch. There is a small triangular costal spot before the apex. There are dull dark markings with a silvery-violet silky sheen in the costal third of the wing. Cilia dull light buff. Hindwings pale golden ocherous with brighter posterior. Apex pale orange. Termen with gray suffusion.

The wingspan of the adult female is 26–27 mm. Its head and thorax are bright ferruginous. Palpus bright ferruginous red with a yellowish upper edge. Abdomen bright golden yellow with a silky gloss. Forewing oblong truncate. Costa sinuate. Forewings light fulvous with a chestnut-brown suffusion. Hindwing light yellowish ocherous.

References

Moths described in 1908
Archips
Moths of Asia